WLGZ-FM (102.7 MHz) is a commercial FM radio station licensed to Webster, New York, and serving the Rochester metropolitan area.  It broadcasts an Oldies/Classic Hits radio format and is owned by DJRO Broadcasting LLC.  The radio studios and offices are in Rochester's east side.

WLGZ has an effective radiated power (ERP) of 6,000 watts.  The transmitter tower is on Ferrano Street in Rochester, near the Erie Canal.  WLGZ broadcasts using HD Radio technology.  Its digital subchannel broadcasts an Urban Contemporary format known as "105.5 The Beat."  The subchannel feeds a 250 watt FM translator, W288CS at 105.5 MHz.

History
On August 23, 1991, the station signed on the air.  The original call sign was WLMF.  On October 30, 1992, the station changed its call letters to WFUL, on February 3, 1993, to WDCZ, on August 1, 1997, to WDCZ-FM, on January 1, 2004, to WRCI.

On February 11, 2008, the station, then owned by Crawford Broadcasting, ended its Contemporary Christian format as WRCI "102.7 The Light" to make way for "Legends 102.7", an Oldies/Adult Standards hybrid. The "Legends" format was already featured on 990 AM WLGZ, which after simulcasting of the FM signal turned to a Christian talk and teaching format.  AM 990 now carries the call letters WDCX, along with much of the programming of Buffalo FM sister station WDCX-FM.

WLGZ was purchased by DJRA Broadcasting on January 1, 2010.  Following WLGZ's sale from Crawford to DJRA, most Adult Standards titles were dropped from the station's playlist and WLGZ morphed into a straightforward Oldies outlet featuring hits of the '50s, '60s and '70s.  The format change for WLGZ has succeeded in increasing the station's audience.

The station's license was assigned to DJRO Broadcasting LLC on June 1, 2012. A noteworthy fact is that this station has not completely discarded songs and artists from the 1960s and early 70s which are not commonly heard on commercial radio.  However, WLGZ has adapted its playlist to feature a greater proportion of songs from the 1980s, as are heard on classic hits outlets.

On September 21, 2017, at 6 p.m., WLGZ-FM launched an urban contemporary format branded as "105.5 The Beat" on its HD2 subchannel, fed on translator W288CS.

References

External links

LGZ-FM
Radio stations established in 1991
Classic hits radio stations in the United States